Jude Anthany Joseph (born Sijo Joseph) is an Indian film director, screenwriter and actor, who works in Malayalam film industry. His directorial debut was with Ohm Shanthi Oshaana in 2014, which won the Best Film with Popular Appeal and Aesthetic Value at the 45th Kerala State Film Awards.

Personal life
Jude Anthany Joseph was born Sijo Joseph. He legally changed his name to Jude Anthany Joseph in 2014, over his affinity towards Jude the Apostle. He is graduated in B-tech Electronics & Communication Engineering from LBS Engineering College, Kasaragod in 2005. Jude married Diyana Ann James on 14 February 2015.

Jude was arrested for verbally abusing a woman mayor in April 2017. He was later released on bail. Later in Dec 2017, he received widespread criticism for his misogynistic Facebook post about a popular woman actor.

Film career
He started his film career with Crazy Gopalan (2008). After that he was assistant director in Malayalam films, Malarvaadi Arts Club (2010) and Thattathin Marayathu (2012). He has also directed two short films, one named Yellow Pen (2012) in which Aju Varghese played the lead role, and the other based on Malayalam movie actor Mammootty's life, titled Mammookka's Biography. Even though the short film was completed in 2011, this was released to public through YouTube only in February 2014. The short film went viral in a short time and has garnered around 59,000 views in a span of one month. He made his directional movie debut through the Malayalam movie Ohm Shanthi Oshaana which was released in February 2014. His second film Oru Muthassi Gadha was released in September 2016. His latest film, Sara's, was released in July 2021.

Other works
He also supports the campaign called 'Karigar Apnao Sanskriti Bachao Abhiyan' ('Adopt an Artisan, Save our Culture') for underprivileged artisans and has created a video for them. He paid for a home for the homeless in Kerala in the scheme created by Dr M.S. Sunil.

Filmography

As director

As actor 

 Short films

 Television

Awards
45th Kerala State Film Awards
 2015: Best Film with Popular Appeal and Aesthetic Value - Ohm Shanthi Oshaana
 2014 :Kerala Film Critics Association Award - Best Debutant director for Ohm Shanthi Oshaana
 2014 : Mohan Raghvan Memorial Award for Best Script ( Ohm Shanthi Oshaana )

References

External links
 

Malayalam film directors
Malayali people
Living people
Male actors from Kochi
Male actors in Malayalam cinema
Indian male film actors
21st-century Indian male actors
Film directors from Kochi
21st-century Indian film directors
Screenwriters from Kochi
Malayalam screenwriters
Year of birth missing (living people)
Place of birth missing (living people)